JLW may refer to:

 Joe Louis Walker (born 1949), American musician
 JLW, the Indian Railways station code for Jhalwara railway station, Madhya Pradesh, India